Kānga pirau (which translates literally from Māori as rotten corn), is a fermented maize (corn) porridge dish made and consumed by the Māori people of New Zealand.

Production
The corn is traditionally prepared by soaking whole corn cobs in streams of running water in woven baskets for several weeks, until the corn kernels have settled to the bottom of the basket. In modern preparations, the corn is soaked in containers filled with water. The resulting fermentation process results in the corn having a rather pungent aroma, hence the name rotten corn. Historically, this fermentation process was also used for the preservation of fish and crustaceans such as crayfish.

Serving
The resulting fermented corn is mashed before serving, and is often served with cream and sugar.

See also 

Boza
 List of porridges
Ogi
Poi
Pozol

References 

Māori cuisine
Fermented foods
Maize dishes